Charles Griffith Wynne (14 August 1815 – 3 March 1874), later known as Charles Wynne-Finch, was a Liberal Tory politician and a Member of Parliament for Caernarfon.

Early life
Wynne was born in London in 1815. He was the oldest son of Charles Griffith-Wynne, MP for Caernarvonshire (1830–1832) and his wife, Sarah Hildyard, the daughter of Rev. Henry Hildyard. His paternal grandfather was the MP Charles Finch.  He received his education at Eton and at Christ Church, Oxford, from where he graduated with a BA in 1837. He also represented the university at cricket, playing two matches for the Oxford University cricket team.

Career
Wynne joined the Canterbury Association on 25 October 1849, and on 8 November of that year joined the management committee.  Together with James FitzGerald, he applied pressure on John Hutt on 26 March 1850 to straighten out the affairs of the association, which caused Hutt to resign three days later.  Wynne was member of the Caernarfon constituency from the 1859 general election to the 1865 general election. He was High Sheriff of Denbighshire in 1869.

Family and death
Wynne's sister, Charlotte Griffith-Wynne, married John Robert Godley in September 1846, who later came to be regarded as the founder of Canterbury in New Zealand. On 15 June 1840, Wynne had married Laura Susan Pollen, the daughter of Richard Pollen (1786–1838) and Anne Cockerell. His wife died on 7 March 1851.  He remarried in 1863 to Jamesina Joyce Ellen Styleman Le Strang, the widow of Henry L'Estrange Styleman Le Strange (d. 1862). She was the daughter of John Stewart (MP). His brother, John Wynne, also played first-class cricket, as did his son Edward.

He died on 3 March 1874 at 4 Rue Solferino, Paris, France.  His estate was probated at £35,000.

References

External links
 

 

1815 births
1874 deaths
Politicians from London
Cricketers from Greater London
Conservative Party (UK) MPs for Welsh constituencies
Members of the Cambrian Archaeological Association
Members of the Canterbury Association
High Sheriffs of Denbighshire
People educated at Eton College
Oxford University cricketers
Alumni of Christ Church, Oxford
Welsh cricketers
UK MPs 1859–1865
Members of Parliament for Caernarfon